Richard Meyer is the Robert and Ruth Halperin Professor in Art History at Stanford University.

Prior to joining Stanford, he was an associate professor of Art History at the University of Southern California. 
He is the author of Outlaw Representation, a book about censorship and homosexuality in American art, and What Was Contemporary Art?, as well as a contributor to Artforum magazine. In 2013, he co-authored the book Art and Queer Culture, with Catherine Lord.

Notes

American art historians
American art critics
Living people
1966 births